, known professionally as  and formerly  is a Japanese voice actress from Toyonaka, Osaka who used to be represented by Aoni Production and Ken Production and is now represented by Kekke Corporation. She was formerly married to Ryōtarō Okiayu and they had a daughter.

Notable roles 
Animal Yokocho (2005) as Kenta
Ushio and Tora (2015) as Izuna

Unknown date
Beyblade (2003) as Daichi Sumeragi
Case Closed as Reiko (ep. 1)
Cosmic Baton Girl Comet-san as Mook
Dance in the Vampire Bund as Hiroe Ubayama
Digimon Universe: Appli Monsters as Copipemon
Infinite Ryvius as Cliff Kei, Eins Crawford
Princess Nine as Hikaru Yosihmoto
Anpanman as Chibi Marine, Futomaki-kun
Ojamajo Doremi as Majorika
PaRappa the Rapper as Ghost (ep. 12)
Gregory Horror Show as Neko Zombie
Kindaichi Case Files as Mako Ichikawa, Asami Hanamura, Madoka Komine
s-CRY-ed as Nasarooku
Rumic Theater as Pitto
Detective School Q as Kyoko Ebu
The Brave Express Might Gaine as Hiroshi
The Long Journey of Porphy as Doora
Tegami Bachi as Steak
Tales of Berseria as Bienfu

Dubbing roles

Live-action 
Blossom as Six LeMeure
The Princess Diaries 2: Royal Engagement as Lilly Moscovitz (Heather Matarazzo)
School of Rock as Alicia "Brace Face" (Aleisha Allen)

Animation 
Star Wars: Ewoks as Wicket W. Warrick
Ice Age: Dawn of the Dinosaurs as Crash
Invader Zim as Zim
Quack Pack as Huey
Thomas & Friends as Mavis (Season 3 only)
Yin Yang Yo! as Yang

References

External links
 
 

1971 births
Living people
People from Toyonaka, Osaka
Japanese video game actresses
Japanese voice actresses
20th-century Japanese actresses
20th-century Japanese women singers
20th-century Japanese singers
21st-century Japanese actresses
21st-century Japanese women singers
21st-century Japanese singers
Aoni Production voice actors
Ken Production voice actors